The 1963 Volta a Catalunya was the 43rd edition of the Volta a Catalunya cycle race and was held from 8 September to 15 September 1963. The race started in Montjuïc and finished in Barcelona. The race was won by Joseph Novales.

General classification

References

1963
Volta
1963 in Spanish road cycling
September 1963 sports events in Europe